The Board of Intermediate and Secondary Education, Jessore is an autonomous organization in Jessore, Bangladesh, mainly responsible for holding two public examinations (SSC & HSC) and for providing recognition to the newly established non-government educational institutions.

District under Jessore Education Board
Bagerhat District
Chuadanga District
Jessore District
Jhenaidah District
Khulna District
Kushtia District
Magura District
Meherpur District
Narail District
Satkhira District

Notable institutions
Jashore colleges:
 Cantonment College, Jashore
 Michael Madhusudan College
 Jashore Government City College

Jessore schools:
 Jessore Zilla School
 Border Guard Public School, Jessore
 Akij Collegiate School, Jhikargachha Upazila

Khulna colleges:
 Khulna Public College

Khulna schools:
 Khulna Zilla School
 Navy Anchorage School and College Khulna
 Bangladesh Navy School and College, Khulna

Chuadanga schools:
 Victoria Jubilee Government High School, Chuadanga

See also
 List of Intermediate and Secondary Education Boards in Bangladesh

References

External links
 Official Website
 Education Boards of Bangladesh
 Directorate of Secondary and Higher Education in Bangladesh

Jashore District
Education Board in Bangladesh
Government boards of Bangladesh
1960s establishments in East Pakistan